Bobby's Girl is the debut album by Aileen Quinn. It was released on cassette and LP in November 1982 by Columbia Records (ARC-38378).  Aileen Quinn released Bobby's Girl in 1982 six months after her debut film Annie was released in theaters.

The titular song of the album is a cover of the Marcie Blane song, "Bobby's Girl", also covered with success in the United Kingdom by Susan Maughan. Backing tracks for Aileen's album were recorded at Lion Share Studios in Hollywood in August 1982. Aileen overdubbed her vocals at the famed Mediasound Studios in New York City in September 1982. The LP was released on November 16, 1982.

Tracks
"Songs" (Dennis Scott) - 3:27
"We Don't Know Why" (Micheal Smotherman) - 4:26
"Spread Some Love (Love is All Around)" (Allen Toussaint) - 4:00
"You Make Me Feel Like Dancing" (Leo Sayer, Vini Poncia) - 3:46
"I'm Going to Go Back There Someday" (Kenneth Ascher, Paul Williams) - 2:44
"(I Wanna Be) Bobby's Girl" (Henry Hoffman, Gary Klein) - 2:50
"The Great Big Difference" (Micheal Smotherman) - 3:49
"Keep On Singing" (Bobby Hart, Danny Janssen) - 3:17
"Give a Little Love" (Henry Gaffney) - 2:48
"Nothing Quite Like Love" (Micheal Smotherman) - 3:30

Personnel
Aileen Quinn: Vocals
Michael Landau, Buzz Feiten: Guitars
Jai Winding: Piano
Robbie Buchanan: Synthesizers
Nathan East: Bass
Rick Shlosser: Drums
Steve Foreman: Percussion

Columbia Records albums
1982 albums